Sidilla Editha "Cedella" Booker (née Malcolm and previously Marley) (July 23, 1926 – April 8, 2008) was a Jamaican singer and writer. She was the mother of reggae musician Bob Marley.

Biography
Booker was born Cedilla Editha Malcolm in Rhoden Hall, Saint Ann Parish, Jamaica, daughter of Albertha Whilby and Omeriah Malcolm, a farmer, "bush doctor", and one of the most respected residents of Nine Mile. Her paternal grandfather was Robert "Uncle Day" Malcolm, who descended from the Coromantee (or Akan) slaves shipped to Jamaica from the Gold Coast, today known as Ghana, in the late seventeenth and early eighteenth centuries. At 18, Cedella Malcolm married 59 year old Norval Sinclair Marley, a white Jamaican of English and rumored Syrian Jewish descent, whose father's family came from England; the family of his mother, Ellen Marley (née Bloomfield), came from the Levant. She became pregnant with his son, Robert Nesta (whose second given name "Nesta" means "wise messenger").  Norval Marley was an officer as well as the plantation overseer. His family applied constant pressure, however, and although he provided financial support for them, the Captain seldom saw his wife and son. Bob was ten years old when Norval died of a heart attack in 1955 at age 70. Cedella and Bob then moved to Trenchtown, a slum neighborhood in Kingston. This was the only place Booker could afford to live at the time, being a young woman moving from the country to the big city on her own.

While living in Trenchtown, Booker gave birth to a daughter, Claudette Pearl, with Taddeus Livingston, the father of Bunny Wailer, who formed the original Wailers trio with Bob Marley and Peter Tosh in 1963. She then married Edward Booker, an American civil servant, and resided first in Delaware, where she gave birth to two more sons, Richard and Anthony, with Booker. After Edward Booker's death in 1976, Cedella moved to Miami, Florida, where she was present at the deathbed of her famous son, who died from cancer in 1981. In 1990, Anthony was killed in a shootout with Miami police, after walking through a shopping mall with a 12 ga. shotgun and opening fire on responding police. Booker lived in Miami for the remainder of her life. She is survived by her son Richard Booker and his children Princess Booker, Crystal Booker and Zaya Booker.

In 1993, Booker conceived and created what is today called the 9 Mile Music Festival, an annual music event held every year since in Miami to help keep alive Bob Marley's message of peace, love, and unity. As part of the admission fee to the one-day music festival, attendees bring canned goods that are collected and donated to help feed the needy in the Miami area through various local charities.

Called "the keeper of the flame," Booker grew voluminous dreadlocks, adopted her grandson Rohan, Bob Marley's son by Janet Hunt, and occasionally performed live with Marley's children, Ky-Mani, Ziggy, Stephen, Damian, and Julian. Later, she released the albums Awake Zion and Smilin' Island of Song. Cedella Booker participated in the festivities in Addis Ababa, Ethiopia, commemorating Marley's 60th birthday in 2005. She also wrote two Marley biographies.

Booker died in her sleep from natural causes in Miami on April 8, 2008; she was 81.

Works authored
Booker wrote two books on the subject of her son, Bob Marley.
 Bob Marley: An Intimate Portrait by His Mother, which was published in 1997 by Penguin Books Ltd (UK), 
 Bob Marley, My Son,  which was published in 2003 by Taylor Trade Publishing,

References

External links
The story of Cedella Booker and Bob Marley
Wailers Discography- Family Tree 
Cedella Marley Booker at the Reggae Kentucky Splash
Cedella Marley about her son Bob Marley 

1926 births
2008 deaths
People from Saint Ann Parish
Jamaican non-fiction writers
Jamaican women writers
Jamaican writers
Jamaican emigrants to the United States
20th-century Jamaican women singers
C
ROIR artists
Jamaican reggae singers
20th-century non-fiction writers